Gustave Massiah, or Gus, (born 1941) is a French economist, urbanist, and political analyst. He was a professor of urbanism at the French Ecole spéciale d'architecture in Paris, as well as the head of the CRID (Centre de recherche et d'information sur le développement).

Gustave Massiah is one of the founders of the French Attac, of which he had been its vice-president until 2006, and he remains a member of its scientific council.

Books
 1975, La Crise de l’impérialisme, with Samir Amin, Alexandre Faire and Mahmoud Hussein, Editions de Minuit, Paris
 1988, Villes en développement – Essai sur les politiques urbaines dans le tiers monde, with Jean-François Tribillon, La Découverte, Paris
 2000, Une économie au service de l’homme, from ATTAC Summer University August 2000. Gustave Massiah Report: «De l’ajustement structurel au respect des droits humains », Éditions Mille et une nuits.
 2004, Le développement a-t-l un avenir ? Pour une économie solidaire et économe, with and directed by Jean-Marie Harribey, Éditions Mille et une nuits.
 2011, Une stratégie de l'altermondialisme, with Élise Massiah, Collection : Cahiers libres, La Découverte, .

References

External links
 Page of the "Editions de Minuit" web site on Gustave Massiah
 Page of Gustave Massiah in the French Wikipedia

French activists
French urban planners
French economists
Anti-globalization writers
Foreign policy writers
1941 births
Living people